Jeholops is an extinct genus of notostracan which existed in the Yixian Formation, inner Mongolia, China during the early Cretaceous period (Barremian age). It was described by Thomas A. Hegna and Ren Dong in 2010, and the only species is Jeholops hongi.

As with the genus Chenops, and unlike the modern genera Triops or Lepidurus, Jeholops lacked eyes.

See also
 Chenops

References

Notostraca
Branchiopoda genera
Prehistoric crustacean genera
Early Cretaceous crustaceans
Fossil taxa described in 2010
Monotypic arthropod genera
Yixian fauna
Barremian genera
Early Cretaceous arthropods of Asia